Sir Alex Ferguson: Never Give In is a 2021 British documentary film about the former Scotland, Aberdeen and Manchester United football manager Sir Alex Ferguson.

The documentary recounts Ferguson's life from his early experiences in Govan, through his playing career as a striker at Rangers amongst others, to his long and successful managerial career, using archive footage and interviews with Ferguson that began in 2016, and includes Ferguson's recovery from his 2018 brain haemorrhage.

The documentary helped Ferguson end a long running feud with Gordon Strachan, his former player at Aberdeen and Manchester United, that had begun in the 1980s. The two went out for lunch and buried the hatchet at the urging of Sir Alex's son Jason. Strachan appears as a talking head in the film along with 11 other interviewees in total: Sir Alex, five family members (Ferguson's wife Cathy Ferguson and their sons, Jason, Mark and Darren along with his brother, Martin Ferguson), two doctors, and Ryan Giggs, Eric Cantona and Archie Knox.

Production
DNA Films and Passion Pictures agreed to co-produce the film. It is produced by BAFTA winner Andrew Macdonald and directed by Sir Alex Ferguson's own son Jason.

Release
Sir Alex Ferguson: Never Give In premiered at the 2021 Glasgow Film Festival. Shortly after, Universal Pictures and Amazon Prime Video purchased the distribution rights to the documentary in the United Kingdom. It was released in UK cinemas on May 27, 2021 by Universal and was made available on Prime Video in the UK and Ireland on May 29.

References

2021 films
Documentary films about association football
Manchester United F.C.
Manchester United F.C. media
Alex Ferguson
Films shot in Greater Manchester
2020s English-language films